Francisco J. Collazo (born 1931) is the Chairman and Founder of Collazo Enterprises Inc. He is the co-founder of COLSA Corporation, a business enterprise he founded with his wife, Carmen, which provides engineering and support services to NASA, the U.S. Army, the U.S. Air Force, the U.S. Navy, the Defense Intelligence Agency, and the Missile Defense Agency.

Early years
Collazo was born in Utuado, Puerto Rico, and grew up on his father's farm. His father was a soldier and a farmer who owned a sugarcane and tobacco farm. His father was a role model who exemplified the values of loyalty and integrity. With this background, he developed his work ethic and received his primary education. At 15, he dropped out of high school and joined the United States Army.

Military Service 
In 1945, Francisco J. Collazo joined the Army at 15 with his father's blessing. He enlisted as an Air Defender, starting as an Air Defense Missile Fire Control Technician Nike and then transitioning to a Fire Distribution Systems Repair Technician. In 1958, the Army promoted him to Chief Warrant Officer. During his remaining 17 years of service, he served in various units, most notably at the Air Defense Board, where he honed his technical expertise. He was technically responsible for the test planning and execution of numerous Artillery systems, including the AN/TSQ-38, AN/MSG-4, AN/TSG-51, and multiple command and control systems. He retired in 1976 as a CW-4, having served in World War II, Korea, and Vietnam. His decorations, detailed below, include the Bronze Star with an Oak Leaf Cluster, a Meritorious Service Medal with 2 Oak Leaf Clusters, and the Army Accommodation Medal.

Education 
Mr. Collazo is a lifetime learner. While in the Army, he attended many technical schools and earned sufficient credit hours to earn the Department of the Army equivalency of a bachelor's degree in Mathematics and Computer Science. Collazo exceeded the course requirements in both disciplines, 42 hours in Mathematics and 34 hours in Computer Science. He could not earn a degree because the individual institutions had residency requirements that he could not meet due to his frequent deployments. Based on this technical coursework and his military and technical experience with complex missile systems, the University of Alabama Huntsville bestowed Mr. Collazo an honorary degree of Doctor of Science in 2003.

COLSA Corporation
Collazo and his wife, whom he married in 1955, moved to Huntsville, Alabama. In 1980, they founded COLSA Corporation in the garage of their home. The company was established as a service-disabled, veteran-owned company with the principal idea of providing systems analysis and engineering to support material development for air defense systems. By 1983, the company had 20 employees.[1] That same year, the Government awarded COLSA its first prime contract.[2] The company moved from Collazo's garage to South Memorial Parkway in Huntsville and later to Sparkman Drive. The company is currently located in Cummings Research Park.[1]

Under Collazo's leadership, the company grew and continued to expand. In 2003, COLSA acquired Huntsville-based Pace and Waite, Inc., and Digital Wizards, Inc. Among COLSA's clients are NASA, the U.S. Army, the U.S. Air Force, the U.S. Navy, the Defense Intelligence Agency, and the Missile Defense Agency.[2] The company has regional offices in Orlando, Florida; Shalimar, Florida; San Diego, California, and Colorado Springs, Colorado[2]

Collazo Enterprises, Inc.

On January 2, 1996, Collazo incorporated Collazo Enterprises, the primary holding company that owns all stock in COLSA Corporation, COLSA International, FJC Growth Capital, and FCA Properties.[2]Collazo has established Scholarships at both the University of Alabama in Huntsville and Auburn University. These scholarships are awarded to full-time students majoring in Engineering, Science, Mathematics, or Technology based on academic merit, leadership potential, and contributions to school and community.[3] Collazo is also an original Partner in Education at the Alabama School of Cyber Technology and Engineering.

Corporate Awards 
From its beginnings in Mr. and Mrs. Collazo's garage in 1980, COLSA grew rapidly grew and received many accolades. In 1983, COLSA was certified under the 8(a) Business Development Program. The SBA certified COLSA as a socially and economically disadvantaged company. In 1988 the Small Business Administration selected COLSA as the Regional Small Business Prime Contractor of the Year. In 1997 COLSA received the Cogswell Award for Excellence in Security Operations, and in 2004 COLSA was inducted into the Alabama Engineering Hall of Fame. NASA awarded COLSA the Small Business Prime Contractor of the year in 2008. In 2012, COLSA Corp. was recognized by Hispanic Business Magazine as one of the top 100 Hispanic Businesses in the United States.[4] In 2020, Washington Technology rated COLSA #76 of the Top 100 Federal Prime Contractors. In 2021, Forbes named COLSA to two of their top lists - Best Employers by State, 4th in Alabama, and America's Best Mid-Sized Employers, 17th overall.

Military awards and decorations
Among Collazo 's decorations are the following:

See also

 List of Puerto Ricans

References

1931 births
Living people
Puerto Rican businesspeople
Puerto Rican Army personnel
American chief executives
People from Utuado, Puerto Rico
Recipients of the Meritorious Service Medal (United States)
United States Army soldiers
United States Army personnel of the Vietnam War
Puerto Rican military officers
University of Texas at Austin College of Natural Sciences alumni